Bologna sausage, informally baloney, is a sausage derived from the Italian mortadella, a similar-looking, finely ground pork sausage, originally from the  city of Bologna. Typical seasonings for bologna include black pepper, nutmeg, allspice, celery seed and coriander, and, like mortadella, myrtle berries give it its distinctive flavor. 

Other common names include parizer (Parisian sausage) in Hungary, Romania, and the countries of the former Yugoslavia,  polony in Zimbabwe, Zambia, South Africa and Western Australia, devon in most states of Australia, and fritz in South Australia.

In North America, a simple and popular use is in the bologna sandwich.

Variations
Aside from pork, "bologna" can be made out of  chicken,  turkey, beef, venison, a combination of meats, or soy protein.

US bologna 
U.S. government regulations require American bologna to be finely ground, and without visible pieces of fat.

Lebanon bologna
Lebanon bologna is a Pennsylvania Dutch prepared meat. While called bologna, it is a cured, smoked and fermented semidry beef sausage similar to salami.

Polony
In the United Kingdom and Ireland, a "polony" is a finely ground pork-and-beef sausage. The name, likely derived from "Bologna", has been in use since the 17th century. The modern product is usually cooked in a red or orange skin and is served as cold slices.

In New Zealand "polony" is a type of cocktail sausage with pink or red artificially-coloured skin similar to, but much smaller than, a saveloy. Miniature polonies in New Zealand are called "Cheerios" and are eaten boiled.

South African "polony" is similar to bologna in constitution and appearance, and is typically inexpensive. Large-diameter (artificially coloured) pink polonies are called "French polony", with thinner rolls referred to simply as "polony". Garlic polony is also widely available.

In 2018 a South African factory that produced polony and other processed meats was associated with a listeriosis outbreak that killed approximately 180 people and sickened a further thousand.

Rag bologna
Rag bologna is a long stick, or "chub", of high-fat bologna native to West Tennessee and its surrounding area. Unavailable beyond it, the sausage is traditionally sold wrapped in a cloth rag. The recipe has a higher content of filler than that of regular bologna. Milk solids, flour, cereal, and spices are added during processing, and the roll of bologna is bathed in lactic acid before being coated in paraffin wax. It is generally eaten on white bread with mustard and pickles, but is also a staple of family gatherings, where thick slices are smoked and barbecued along with other meats. In Newfoundland, a type of rag bologna referred to as "wax" bologna is sliced thickly and fried, which is referred to as "Newfie steak".

Ring bologna

Ring bologna is much smaller in diameter than standard bologna. It is better suited for slicing and serving on crackers, either as a snack or hors d'oeuvre. It is generally sold as an entire link rather than sliced. The link is arranged as a semicircle or "ring" when prepared for sale (hence the name). Pickled bologna is usually made from ring bologna soaked in vinegar and typical pickling spices. It is usually served in chunks as a cold snack.

Vegetarian bologna
Various vegetarian and vegan versions of bologna are available. A typical UK recipe uses soya and wheat protein in the place of lean meat and palm oil instead of fat together with starch, carrageenan, and flavorings. It can be eaten cold or cooked in the same ways as traditional bologna.

See also

 
 Doktorskaya kolbasa — a Russian take on bologna or mortadella, though spiced differently
 Chả lụa - a Vietnamese sausage, similar to bologna
 Falukorv
 Leberkäse

References

American sausages
Lunch meat
Cooked sausages
Smoked meat

fi:Lauantaimakkara